Ezzabad (also Romanized as ‘Ezzābād; also known as 'Ez Abad Marvdasht and ‘Ezzābād-e Marvdasht) is a village in Mohammadabad Rural District, in the Central District of Marvdasht County, Fars Province, Iran. At the 2006 census, its population was 678, in 168 families.

References 

Populated places in Marvdasht County